"Bad Girl" is a song by Japanese recording artist Meisa Kuroki from her debut extended play (EP), Hellcat. The song was one of the main tracks used to promote the album. "Bad Girl" was featured in the 2009 film Crows Zero 2, in which Kuroki also appears. A "movie version" of the song was included on the film's soundtrack, released simultaneously with Hellcat on April 8, 2009. The music video for "Bad Girl" was directed by Kensuke Kawamura.

Credits and personnel
Meisa Kuroki – main vocals
June – songwriter, producer, arrangement, instruments, programming
U-ka – songwriter
Neeraj Khajanchi (Nippon no Kokoro Sound) – recording
D.O.I. (Daimonion Recordings) – mixing
Yuji Chinone (Sony Music Studios Tokyo) – mastering

Credits adapted from Hellcat's liner notes.

Charts

References 

2009 songs
Meisa Kuroki songs